Percichthys is a genus of temperate perches native to freshwater habitats in Argentina and Chile.

Species
The currently recognized species in this genus are:
 Percichthys chilensis Girard, 1855
 Percichthys colhuapiensis MacDonagh, 1955 (largemouth perch)
 Percichthys laevis (Jenyns, 1840)
 Percichthys melanops Girard, 1855
 Percichthys trucha (Valenciennes, 1833) (creole perch)

References

Percichthyidae
Taxonomy articles created by Polbot